Arabella Latham (born 19 August 1997), known professionally as Baby Queen, is a South African singer based in London. Born and raised in Durban, South Africa, she moved to London at 18 to pursue a career in music and signed to record label Polydor in 2020.

Her first EP, Medicine, was released in November 2020, followed by her debut mixtape, The Yearbook, in September 2021. She made the long list for the Radio 1 Sound of 2022.

Early life 

Latham was born and brought up in Durban, South Africa. Her parents both worked at an art supply company owned by her father, while also operating a small art gallery located above this shop. Latham claims her upbringing in South Africa has contributed to her confident personality and the loudness of her Baby Queen persona.

At 18, with her parents' blessing, Latham emigrated to London in order to pursue her music career. Initially living with her aunt in Fulham, Latham would move out and become immersed in the city's nightlife. During this time, Latham claims to have developed issues with substance abuse, using drugs to counteract her depression. It was after what she describes as a "horrific night in East London" following a break-up in 2017 that Latham would write "the first ever Baby Queen song", the stream-of-consciousness style "Raw Thoughts". The song allegedly took only 20 minutes to write and would set the precedent for Latham's self-proclaimed lyrical openness and "uncomfortably honest" attitude towards the topics of drug use and mental health.

Latham admits to having unrealistic expectations about the ease of getting a record deal in London, a city with a much more flourishing music industry than her South-African hometown. She recounts her initial plans of "making it" by knocking on music labels' doors with her mixtapes. Despite initial setbacks, Latham would continue writing songs while working at Rough Trade East record shop in Brick Lane, London. She worked at Rough Trade from 2019 until 2020 and the COVID-19 pandemic. Latham recalls jotting down lyrics on post-it notes during her shifts, collating them in what became known as "Bella's Wall" in the staff room. Latham also worked as a waitress at the Brit Awards, hoping erroneously to network with the attending celebrities. It would take six years living in London before Latham would sign to Polydor Records over Zoom in 2020.

Career

2015–2020: Career beginnings 
Latham discovered her song-writing abilities by the age of 11 or 12. She arrived in London in 2015 with around 40 demo CDs which she had written during her teenage years in South Africa. The first song written for the Baby Queen project, "Raw Thoughts" was composed following a breakup in 2017. From 2019 onwards, Latham continued writing songs while working at Rough Trade East. In early 2020, amidst lockdown due to the COVID-19 pandemic, she left Rough Trade and signed to Polydor Records.

2020: Medicine 
After signing to record label Polydor, Latham's first EP, Medicine, was released on 11 November 2020. The first track to be written for the EP was "Buzzkill", which was completed in 2018. The remaining tracks were allegedly written between late 2019 and early 2020, which resulted in much of the EP's production happening remotely during the COVID-19 pandemic. Latham claims that she co-wrote "Pretty Girl Lie" with her producer over Zoom in 2020, and that the vocals for "Medicine, "Want Me" and "Online Dating" were all recorded in a makeshift studio in her bedroom due to lockdown.

The songs "Internet Religion", "Buzzkill", "Pretty Girl Lie", "Want Me" and the title track "Medicine" were promoted as singles. Each track was accompanied by an official music video and lyric video released on YouTube in the months leading up to Medicine'''s release. The only remaining non-single on the EP, "Online Dating" received a hybrid lyric and music video entitled "Online Dating (Baby Kingdom)" on 11 November, the day of the EP's release. "Baby Kingdom" is the term given to Latham's fans.

During the promotion of Medicine, Latham also periodically uploaded covers to her YouTube channel. Songs covered during this time period include "I Don't Want To Get Over You" by The Magnetic Fields, "Mirrorball" by Taylor Swift and "Halloween" by Phoebe Bridgers.

On 1 December 2020, Latham released a cover of the classic Christmas carol "Santa Baby". Latham was inspired to cover a Christmas song by the childhood memory of her dad's Christmas mixtape, and she explains her choice of "Santa Baby" by the fact that it's "cheeky and satirical lyrics" align with the rest of her discography and persona. The single was not attached to an album and received minimal promotion, with no music or lyric video.

 2021: The Yearbook 
Latham's debut mixtape, The Yearbook, was released on 3 September 2021. The songs "Raw Thoughts", "These Drugs", "Dover Beach", "American Dream", featuring Australian singer-songwriter May-a, and "You Shaped Hole" were promoted as singles leading up to The Yearbook's release. While all singles received music videos on YouTube, only "Raw Thoughts", "These Drugs" and "Dover Beach" also received lyric videos. The track "Narcissist" was promoted as a single after the album's release, with a music video uploaded to YouTube on 8 October 2021. "You Shaped Hole" was also included in the FIFA 22 soundtrack.

 2022: Heartstopper and upcoming debut studio album 

The single "Wannabe" was released on 10 November 2021, accompanied by a music video on YouTube. The song is not yet attributed to an album or EP. Her next single, "Colours of You", was released on 22 April 2022. The track was used to promote the Netflix series Heartstopper, with a series of videos featuring the cast with Baby Queen were posted on the social media platform TikTok. Two additional singles from Latham's debut album have since been released. "Nobody Really Cares" and "LAZY" were both previewed on social media, as well as being part of Latham's live shows.

 Artistry 

 Influences 

Latham cites her earliest influences as the artists she grew up listening to, such as Fleetwood Mac and the Beatles. She recalls a home video of herself, three years of age and dancing to Madonna's "Like a Virgin". The first CD Latham bought herself was the Twilight soundtrack. Her first concert was Lady Gaga's The Monster Ball Tour in Cape Town, an experience she describes as "electrifying". Taylor Swift was the first artist Latham had found and started listening to on her own, separate from her parents' influence. Latham cites Swift as the inspiration behind her entire career path. She recounts watching the music video for "Love Story" at age 12 and having a moment of realisation that, in Latham's words, "this is what I'm doing". "Love Story" remains Latham's go-to karaoke song. She is still an avid Swift fan, stating that her ultimate goal is to "drink wine with Taylor Swift and sing a song at the Grammy's". Latham does, however, admit that her childhood obsession with the singer resulted in her earlier songs, written in her teen years in South Africa, defaulting to "really Americanised country-pop music".

Latham identifies a drastic shift in her music taste after moving to London and experiencing mental health issues as well as other hardships. It was around this time she started listening to "super emo music". Latham claims she owes the 90s rock undertone of some of her songs to artists such as Courtney Love, the Smashing Pumpkins and Nine Inch Nails.

Latham describes her work as anti-pop, a genre she defines as the sound of a generation that is "sick and fucking tired of it". She likens herself to Billie Eilish, Melanie Martinez and Clairo in that she subverts the "bubblegum pop girl" stereotype of previous decades of pop music. Latham states that the artists she talks about most with her producer, King Ed, are St. Vincent, Sharon Van Etten, Anna Calvi and MGMT. In terms of her lyricism, Latham cites the 1975, Kae Tempest, Taylor Swift and Lorde as major influences. Latham is also specifically a fan of the lyricism of Matty Healy, vocalist and guitarist in the band the 1975. Healy visited Latham on the set of the "Buzzkill" music video after their mutual stylist found out Latham was a fan.

 Gameplay with Baby Queen 
On 7 November 2021, Latham announced her new gaming show "Gameplay with Baby Queen" on Instagram and Twitter. The same day, the first volume of the show was broadcast to BBC Sounds. "Gameplay with Baby Queen" focuses on video game soundtracks and features music selected by Latham herself. Each episode is an hour long and is available online for 30 days after being uploaded. The first volume included songs from The Legend of Zelda, Sable, and Red Redemption 2. The second instalment was uploaded on 20 November 2021 and included tracks from Chrono Trigger, The Last of Us, and The Witcher 3: Wild Hunt. Personal life 
Latham has publicly stated that she does not define her sexuality. She describes experiencing stigma towards her sexual ambiguity growing up in South Africa, where queer identities are still not widely visible or considered acceptable. Even after moving to London, Latham recalls the "biphobic rhetoric" of some people she would meet.

Latham's attraction to women is often expressed in her lyrics. The song "Raw Thoughts" was dubbed a "bi anthem" by fans after Latham revealed that the lyrics were about a woman. Latham cites her attraction to Jodie Comer from Killing Eve as the inspiration behind "Want Me". The track was used as the opening song for the coming-of-age LGBT series Heartstopper (2022). The track "American Dream" features openly-queer Australian singer-songwriter May-a and describes a "childlike crush" that exists purely in one's mind. Although the lyrics are gender neutral, the accompanying music video features Latham playing a waitress, daydreaming about a female customer at the café where she works.  Latham's experiences with homophobia also inspire her song-writing. She cites her attraction to women as one reason why she was deemed a "loser" or a "wannabe" by school bullies. These childhood experiences informed the "underdog anthem", "Wannabe", in which Latham proudly embraces these titles.

Throughout her discography, Latham has also described her struggles with eating disorders and depression as a child, as well as her unhealthy relationship with drugs since moving to London. "Pretty Girl Lie", a song which discusses issues with the performative nature of social media and the internet, was inspired partially by the body dysmorphia Latham experienced growing up. In "These Drugs", the track which Latham claims is her most personal release to date, she describes her disastrous mental health and reliance on drugs at a point in time when she was not seeking help for her depression. The song "Medicine" acts as a sequel and details Latham's complicated relationship with antidepressants, which she has been taking on and off since age 16. As a general rule, Latham admits she takes issue with songs that lack honesty or raw emotion, and strives to transmit her deep personal struggles, along with her dark and satirical personality in her own lyricism.

 Discography 

 Mixtapes 

 Extended plays 

 Singles 

 Tours 

 Headlining 
 UK Tour (April 2022)

 Supporting 

 The Weird Time of Life Tour (virtual tour, with Yungblud) (2020)
 SOUR Tour'' (Olivia Rodrigo) (2022) (UK + Europe dates)

References

External links 
 YouTube channel

1997 births
Living people
21st-century South African women singers
South African pop singers
21st-century British women singers
English women singer-songwriters
English women pop singers
South African expatriates in England
South African LGBT singers